Raúl Alexandre (22 January 1910 – ?) was a Portuguese footballer who played as a midfielder.

References 
 
 
 

1910 births
Portuguese footballers
Association football midfielders
Primeira Liga players
Vitória F.C. players
Portugal international footballers
Year of death missing
Place of birth missing